The New Zealand national under-16 and under-17 basketball team is a national basketball team of New Zealand, governed by Basketball New Zealand. It represents the country in international under-16 and under-17 (under age 16 and under age 17) basketball competitions.

World Cup record

References

External links
Official website

U
Men's national under-17 basketball teams